Freddy Frogface is a 2011 Danish 3D animated comedy film directed by Peter Dodd, and based on the book Orla Frøsnapper by Ole Lund Kirkegaard. It was later dubbed into English and was released in several other countries. It is the first film in a trilogy of computer-animated films based on children's books by Kirkegaard, after Jelly T (2012) and  Otto the Rhino (2013).

Plot
Freddy was framed by victor and Jacob and their dog sausage. Victor was so wrong he even embarrassed Freddy in the town square throwing a frog in his mouth, he proceeded to call him Freddy frog face. This girl got a crush on Freddy and started dating him. A circus happened and Freddy had so much talent they accepted him to work there.

Original Danish Cast
 Nikolaj Lie Kaas as Orla Frøsnapper / Tryllekunster / Klovn
 Thure Lindhardt as Victor
 Nicolaj Kopernikus as Jakob / Lille Louis / Kontrollør / Fakir
 Katrine Falkenberg as Clara
 Margrethe Koytu as Fru Olsen
 Ole Thestrup as Smeden / Slagter Jørgensen
 David Bateson as Bardini
 Cecilie Stenspil as Fru Svensson / Fru Strong / Fru Sivertsen
 Lars Thiesgaard as Mister Strong
 Lasse Lunderskov as Kanonkongen / Hr. Svensson / Kanonmand
 Lars Ranthe as Linedanser

English dub cast
Freddy Frogface - Bruce Mackinnon
Victor - Gregg Chillin
Jacob - Jim North
Clara - Katrine Falkenberg
Little Louis - Katrine Falkenberg
Mrs. Willough - Tina Robinson
Mr. Svensson - Jim North
Mrs. Svensson - Tina Robinson
Ming Bozelius - Jim North
Bardini - David Bateson
Cannonball King - David Bateson
Ole Antonioni - Andrew Jeffers
Mr. Strong - Ian Burns
Mrs. Strong - Tina Robinson
Blacksmith - David Bateson
Circus Man - Ian Burns
Grandpa - Ian Burns
Boys - Jeremy Keil Byrn
Girls - Olivia Keil Byrn
Mrs. Olsen - Tina Robinson
Carlo Androkles - Andrew Jeffers
Butcher Jonathan - Andrew Jeffers

References

External links
 

2011 films
2011 animated films
Danish animated films
2010s Danish-language films